Reginald Bert Marsh (11 August 1897 – 25 April 1969) played first-class cricket for Somerset in four matches, two in each of the 1928 and 1934 seasons. He was born at Wells, Somerset and died at Bristol.

Marsh was a right-handed lower-order batsman and a right-arm medium-pace bowler. His two matches in May 1928 were both drawn, with the second game against Derbyshire badly affected by rain. In 1934, he was used as an opening bowler and took the only two wickets of his first-class career in the game against Surrey, though at a high cost. In this match he also made his highest score, an unbeaten 24 as Somerset saved the match after a rearguard batting revival led by Arthur Wellard.

In 1941 he made a non-first-class appearance in a Services match between Somerset and Gloucestershire in which he was Gloucestershire Services' most successful bowler and batsman in a heavy defeat by Somerset Services.

References

1897 births
1969 deaths
English cricketers
Somerset cricketers
People from Wells, Somerset